The Imperial Diet was the primary legislative body in the Holy Roman Empire after 1648. Various princes, bishops, abbots and free cities convened in Regensburg to vote upon and enact laws across the Empire. The allocation of votes were carefully considered with a goal of maintaining balance between Protestant and Catholic princes. Votes were cast by princes in relation to the number of estates with voting rights and the members were arranged into 3 colleges; and 2 prelate benches, 4 count benches, and 2 free city benches.

Following the French Revolution, French forces defeated Imperial forces and occupied most Imperial land on the left bank of the Rhine. France formally annexed the left bank by the Treaty of Campo Formio in 1797, and German princes were stripped of this land though it was not until the Treaty of Lunéville in 1801 that this was enforced. The Treaty of Lunéville also specified that princes that lost land to France, as well as certain dispossessed Italian princes, were to be compensated with new lands elsewhere in the Empire. It was swiftly decided that the ecclesiastical principalities and free cities would be suppressed and dispersed.

The compensation was arranged according to a plan devised between the French and Russian delegations in 1802. In drafting the compensation for the dispossessed nobility, the French ambassador Talleyrand received substantial bribes (estimated as much as 10 million francs) from nobility clamouring for more favourable settlements. In general the more French-friendly princes received far greater compensation. As votes in the Imperial Diet were tied to specific territories the voting members possessed, the allocation of votes in the Diet also needed to be updated to both remove lands that were ceded to France as well as update to the new political landscape. Several members, particularly Austria, Bavaria and Prussia, received several new votes from preexisting members. The order of existing votes were also shuffled to some extent. Several counts from the four comital benches were also raised to the princes' college. In effect the number of votes in the College of Princes increased from 100 to 131.

An Imperial deputation (Reichsdeputation) approved the plan on 25 February 1803, and the Imperial Diet universally ratified this Reichsdeputationshauptschluss on 24 March. The Emperor Francis II, Holy Roman Emperor ratified it on 27 April that year and it became law despite the Emperor's reservations regarding the reallocation of votes in the Imperial Diet as the balance between Protestant and Catholic estates being altered heavily in the formers' favour.

The following tables lists the members in the Imperial Diet in 1792 before the loss of territory to France, and the reallocated votes as per the Reichsdeputationhauptschluss in 1803. 1792 territories in italics were annexed by France. The lists below uses the interchanged voting of Ecclesiastical and Secular princes format. Ecclesiastical territories are shaded purple, and free cities are shaded red.

College of Electors

College of Princes

Bench of Counts of Swabia

Bench of Counts of the Wetterau

Bench of Counts of Franconia

Bench of Counts of Westphalia

College of Cities 

Holy Roman Empire-related lists
Germany history-related lists
Lists of states in the Holy Roman Empire
1803 in the Holy Roman Empire
1803 in politics